The 1956 United States Senate election in Louisiana was held on November 6, 1956. Incumbent Democratic U.S. Senator Russell B. Long won re-election to a third term.

At this time, Louisiana was a one-party state. Long's victory in the July 31 primary was tantamount to election, and he was unopposed in the general election.

Democratic primary 	
The Democratic primary was held on July 31, 1956.

Candidates 
Russell B. Long, incumbent U.S. Senator, unopposed

Results

General election

Results

See also 
 1956 United States Senate elections

References

Bibliography
 

1956
Louisiana
United States Senate